Liske is an unincorporated community located in Pulawski Township, Presque Isle County, Michigan, United States. The commuintiy is eight miles south east of Rogers City, the county seat.

References

Unincorporated communities in Presque Isle County, Michigan
Unincorporated communities in Michigan